Three cities submitted bids to host the 2003 Pan American Games that were recognized by the Pan American Sports Organization. Santo Domingo was selected by PASO to host the XIV Pan American Games in the second round of voting on December 6, 1998, at its general assembly held in Panama City, Panama.

Host city selection 
Medellin was eliminated in the first round, as 26 votes were needed to win. Santo Domingo won the majority vote in the first and second rounds with 24 votes and 28 votes, respectively.

Candidate cities

Santo Domingo, Dominican Republic 
Following the 1986 Central American and Caribbean Games held in Santiago de los Caballeros, President of the Dominican Republic Olympic Committee Dr. José Joaquín Puello announced a 13-point "ten-year plan," from 1989 to 1999, in which the last point was to hold the Pan American Games. The country gained support of President of the Pan American Sports Organization Mario Vázquez Raña following thereafter; on June 24, 1986 Raña urged Puello to bid for Pan American Games. Santo Domingo had submitted a bid for the 1999 Pan American Games, but lost to Winnipeg by one vote.

Santo Domingo's campaign to host the 2003 Games focused on winning over the smaller countries, using the slogan los pequeños también pueden (English: the little ones can too), and it proved to be effective. Puello also gained the support of newly-elected president Leonel Fernandez, even though broad sectors rejected the project.

In the first round of voting, Medellin was eliminated. Santo Domingo and Medellin had an agreement that if one of the two cities was eliminated in the first round, they would vote for the other in the second. Santo Domingo won in the second round.

Guadalajara, Mexico 
In 1996, Mayor César Coll Carabias launched the first ever candidacy for Guadalajara to host the 2003 Pan American Games. Guadalajara had most of the sports venues necessary and a wealth of experience in organizing multi-sport events. Additionally, president of the Pan American Sports Organization Mario Vázquez Raña supported the city. In an effort to gain support for Guadalajara, Mexican delegates had offered to give about $51,000 to each of the 41 National Olympic Committees to be used for training programs for athletes. The Colombian delegation responded to this by accusing Mexico of vote-buying. Guadalajara lost to Santo Domingo in the second round.

Medellin, Colombia 
Medellin had boasted an excellent climate condition, as well as the fact that most of the facilities that would have been necessary already existed, but security considerations were a major concern. General Rosso José Serrano attempted to alleviate concerns over safety in Medellin. Medellin was eliminated was eliminated in the first round of voting. Keeping their promise to vote for Santo Domingo if they were eliminated in the first round, Medellin voted for Santo Domingo in the second.

Showed preliminary interest 
 Santiago, Chile
Santiago did show interest in hosting the 2003 Games, but in June 1998, the city decided not to further any attempt for hosting the games.

References

2003 Pan American Games
Bids for the Pan American Games